Franz Xaver Zettler (1841-1916) was a German stained glass artist.

Early life
Zettler was born in 1841.

Career

He started his own stained glass design company in 1870.

He designed some of the stained glass in the Deutsche Evangelische Christuskirche in Knightsbridge, London in 1904-1905. He designed a window depicting The Crucifixion that today stands in Badin Hall.

Personal life
His father-in-law, Joseph Mayer, was also a stained glass designer.

Death
He died in 1916.

References

1841 births
1916 deaths
German stained glass artists and manufacturers
19th-century German artists
20th-century German artists
19th-century German male artists
20th-century German male artists